Mobilize is the fourth studio album by punk rock band Anti-Flag.  It contains eight new studio tracks, and eight live songs.

The album's live tracks were recorded at the Mr. Roboto Project, a cooperatively-organized and volunteer-run DIY venue in Wilkinsburg, Pennsylvania (just outside Pittsburgh's city limits).

Track listing
All tracks written by Justin Sane except as noted.

Live Songs

(The first pressing contained a bonus compilation disc showcasing A-F records bands from 1998-2002.)

Personnel
 Justin Sane - Guitar & Lead Vocals
 Chris Head - Guitar & Vocals
 Chris #2 - Bass & Lead Vocals
 Pat Thetic - Drums
 Spaz - Vocals on "Spaz's House Destruction Party"; he also appears after "Die For Your Government" with the band where he sings "Coz I Got High" and "Coz Pat Got High"

Charts

References

2002 albums
A-F Records albums
Anti-Flag albums